Elongation may refer to:

 Elongation (astronomy)
 Elongation (geometry)
 Elongation (plasma physics)
 Part of transcription of DNA into RNA of all types, including mRNA, tRNA, rRNA, etc.
 Part of translation (biology) of mRNA into proteins
 Elongated organisms
 Stretch ratio in the physics of deformation

See also